Getaneh Kebede Gebeto (born 2 April 1992) is an Ethiopian professional footballer who plays as a striker for Ethiopian Premier League club Wolkite City.

Club career
Getaneh was born in Addis Ababa, Ethiopia. He began his club career with Debub Police, before which he moved to Dedebit. He was the 2013 top scorer of the Ethiopian Premier League. On 19 July 2013, it was announced that Getaneh succeeded in a trial with Bidvest Wits and signed a three-year contract with the team. In September 2016 he joined his old club Dedebit. On 14 August 2018, the 29-time league champions Saint George announced they had signed Getaneh to a two year contract.

International career
Getaneh was part of the Ethiopia national team, where he made his debut in a 2010 CECAFA Cup match against Malawi in December 2010. In a 2014 FIFA World Cup qualifier against Somalia, he scored two goals in a second leg 5–0 win, which sent Ethiopia to the second round of World Cup qualification. On 29 March 2016, Getaneh scored twice against Algeria in a 2017 Africa Cup of Nations qualifier held in Addis Ababa to draw 3–3 and deny the Desert Foxes qualification to the final tournament. He scored two goals against Lesotho in a 2–1 win on 5 June 2016 and added one more goal in the return match at the Hawassa Kenema Stadium on 3 September 2016. Ethiopia won the game 2–1 and finished runners-up in Group J, though they were unable to qualify for the 2017 Africa Cup of Nations. However, Getaneh finished as the second top scorer of qualification with six goals, behind only Hillal Soudani of Algeria's seven goals.

On 31 December 2022, Getaneh announced his retirement from international football.

Career statistics
Scores and results list Ethiopia's goal tally first, score column indicates score after each Getaneh goal.

References

External links
 

1992 births
Living people
Sportspeople from Addis Ababa
Ethiopian footballers
Association football forwards
Ethiopia international footballers
2013 Africa Cup of Nations players
2021 Africa Cup of Nations players
Bidvest Wits F.C. players
University of Pretoria F.C. players
Saint George S.C. players
Wolkite City F.C. players
Ethiopian expatriate footballers
Ethiopian expatriate sportspeople in South Africa
Expatriate soccer players in South Africa